Fairall may refer to:

 Anthony Patrick Fairall (1943–2008), South African astronomer
 Harry K. Fairall (1882–1958), American camera technician and inventor
 Nicholas Fairall (born 1989), American ski jumper
 Percy Fairall (1909–1980), Australian rugby league footballer

See also
 Fairall's honey-suckle (Lambertia fairallii)